Lesław Grech (born 17 March 1972) is a retired Polish football midfielder.

References

1972 births
Living people
Polish footballers
Zagłębie Lubin players
Śląsk Wrocław players
Lechia Zielona Góra players
Chrobry Głogów players
Górnik Polkowice players
Association football midfielders